Red Action is a far-left political organization in Croatia. As a self-proclaimed anti-imperialist organization, it strongly opposes the North Atlantic Treaty Organization (NATO) and is known for attacking NATO symbols with red paint. It also considers the European Union to be an instrument for Western European imperialism and exploitation of Eastern Europe, along with the rest of the world.

During the 2009 Israel-Gaza conflict, it organized a protest of solidarity with Palestinians together with the Muslim community in Zagreb. It supports LGBT rights and is an active participant in Zagreb Pride events. Red Action attends workers' protests and is highly critical of trade union officials. This organization was an active participant in the 2009 student protests in Croatia and was described by the media as one of key organizers during the 2011 anti-government protests in Croatia.

Internationally, Red Action supports guerrilla movements such as the Revolutionary Armed Forces of Colombia, the Popular Front for the Liberation of Palestine, the Democratic Front for the Liberation of Palestine, the Kurdistan Workers' Party, and the Naxalites. They also supported the 2008 Greek riots and have participated in protests of solidarity with Serbian anarchists accused of attacking Belgrade's Greek embassy during an anti-NATO protest in 2011.

In 2020, Red Action merged with the Serbian organisation Red Initiative (Crvena inicijativa) to form Red Action/Red Initiative (Crvena akcija / Crvena inicijativa).

See also
Croatian Labourists – Labour Party
Party of Labour (Serbia)

References

External links
Official web site (with some English)

2009 establishments in Croatia
Anti-revisionist organizations
Communist parties in Croatia
Eurosceptic parties in Croatia
Far-left political parties